Michigan was an unincorporated community and coal town in Fayette County, West Virginia.

References 

Unincorporated communities in West Virginia
Unincorporated communities in Fayette County, West Virginia
Coal towns in West Virginia
Ghost towns in West Virginia